Maddin in Love is a German television series.

See also
List of German television series

External links
 

German comedy television series
Television shows set in Hesse
2008 German television series debuts
2008 German television series endings
German-language television shows
Sat.1 original programming